Bullerup is a village and northeastern suburb of Odense, Funen, Denmark.  It is located near Agedrup and Seden.

References

Suburbs of Odense
Populated places in Funen